Anixia bresadolae is a species of fungus belonging to the Anixia genus. It was discovered 1902 by Austrian mycologist Franz Xaver Rudolf von Höhnel.

References 

Agaricomycetes
Fungi described in 1902